Avner-Hai Shaki (5 February 1926 - 28 May 2005) was an Israeli politician who served as a government minister in the late 1980s and early 1990s.

Biography
Born in Safed during the Mandate era, Shaki studied law, gaining a PhD from the Hebrew University of Jerusalem. He later worked as a lecturer in universities in Canada and the United States.

On 16 July 1970 he entered the Knesset on the National Religious Party's list as a replacement for the deceased Haim-Moshe Shapira, and in September that year Shaki was appointed Deputy Minister of Education and Culture. He left the cabinet on 17 July 1972, and on 22 May 1973 he left the party to sit as an Independent, remaining an MK until the next elections.

Shaki returned to the NRP and was elected to the Knesset in 1984. Re-elected in 1988, he was appointed Minister without Portfolio responsible for Jerusalem Affairs in December that year. In 1990 he was appointed Minister of Religious Affairs, serving until the Likud-led coalition lost power following the 1992 elections. Shaki was re-elected in 1992 and 1996, but lost his seat in the 1999 elections.

References

External links
 

1926 births
2005 deaths
People from Safed
Jews in Mandatory Palestine
Hebrew University of Jerusalem alumni
Israeli educators
20th-century Israeli lawyers
National Religious Party leaders
Members of the 7th Knesset (1969–1974)
Members of the 11th Knesset (1984–1988)
Members of the 12th Knesset (1988–1992)
Members of the 13th Knesset (1992–1996)
Members of the 14th Knesset (1996–1999)
Ministers of Religious affairs of Israel
Deputy ministers of Israel
Burials at Yarkon Cemetery